Colwellia  is a genus of deep-sea psychrophilic, piezophilic, and facultative anaerobic bacteria from the family Colwelliaceae. Colwellia grows at a temperature at −20 °C by producing cryoprotective polymeric substances.

References

Further reading 
 
 
 
 
 
 
 <

Alteromonadales
Bacteria genera
Psychrophiles